Feihyla is a genus of frogs in the family Rhacophoridae, subfamily Rhacophorinae. They are found in southern China and Vietnam, and likely also in Laos. Its phylogenetic position is not yet fully resolved, but it is probably the sister taxon to Taruga, Polypedates, and Rhacophorus. Feihyla was originally erected to resolve polyphyly of Chirixalus by absorbing "Chirixalus palpebralis".

Description
The synapomorphy diagnosing Feihyla is its reproductive mode, laying eggs in a jelly containing some bubbles.

Species
The following species are recognized in the genus Feihyla:
 Feihyla fuhua Fei, Ye, and Jiang, 2010
 Feihyla inexpectata (Matsui, Shimada, and Sudin, 2014)
 Feihyla kajau (Dring, 1983)
 Feihyla palpebralis (Smith, 1924)
 Feihyla samkosensis (Grismer, Neang, Chav, and Holden, 2007)
 Feihyla vittiger (Boulenger, 1897)

References

 
Rhacophoridae
Amphibians of Asia
Amphibian genera